For the Love of Music Tour was the sixth concert tour by American group En Vogue. It comes ahead of the group's anticipated seventh studio album Electric Café (2017).

History
For the Love of Music was a European tour that En Vogue launched on April 6, 2017, in Dublin, Ireland and concluded in Bremen, Germany on April 25.  The Tour was first announced on February 8, 2017.

In addition to renditions of the group's recorded material, En Vogue also performed a tribute to celebrated female singers of times past during an "Old School Medley" section of their show. Notable songs performed were "Respect" by Aretha Franklin and "Proud Mary" by Tina Turner.

Reception
Reviews of For the Love of Music cited the impressive vocals of the group's members as well as the intricate instrumentation of the songs, and praised the group's set list. Others praised the high energy of the group's members; the party atmosphere of the concert and the modernization of some of the group's notable classic hits.

Set list
"Instrumental Intro"
"No No No (Can't Come Back)"
"My Lovin' (You're Never Gonna Get It)"
"You Don't Have to Worry"
"Lies"
"Whatta Man"
"Ooh Boy"
"Free Your Mind"
"Give It Up, Turn It Loose"
"Emotions"
"Deja Vu" (Remixed)
"Don't Let Go (Love)"
"Old School Medley"
"Giving Him Something He Can Feel"
"Piece of My Love"
"Hold On"
Source:

Tour dates

External links
 Official Website
 Official Facebook

References

2017 concert tours